Anaphalis javanica, the Javanese edelweiss, is a flowering plant species endemic to Indonesia. They are found mostly in mountainous regions of Java, southern Sumatra, southern Sulawesi and Lombok.  Although a mature plant can reach eight metres in height, most specimens are less than a metre tall. The flower are generally seen between April and August. A bird species, the Javan whistling thrush (Myophonus glaucinus), nests in the plant's branches.

Threats
Known as bunga abadi in Indonesian, literally means eternal flower, this plant is popular among tourists. Dried flowers are often sold as souvenirs. This could lead to the destruction of the wild grown species. In the Bromo-Tengger region in East Java this plant is considered extinct. This species is constantly decreasing in number and is currently protected in Gunung Gede Pangrango National Park.

The plant has been protected under Indonesian law since 1990.

Gallery

References

External links

javanica
Flora of Java
Flora of the Lesser Sunda Islands
Flora of Sulawesi
Flora of Sumatra
Plants described in 1826